Ole Hansen may refer to:

 Ole Hansen (politician) (1855–1928), Danish politician
 Ole Hansen (officer) (1842–1922), Norwegian army officer
 Ole Christoffer Heieren Hansen (born 1987), Norwegian footballer
 Ole Jacob Hansen (1940–2000), Norwegian jazz musician

See also
 Ole Hanson (1874–1940), American politician